The women's K-2 500 metres event was a pairs kayaking event conducted as part of the Canoeing at the 1996 Summer Olympics program.

Medalists

Results

Heats
20 crews entered in three heats. The top three finishers in each heat advanced to the semifinals while the rest advanced to the repechages.

Repechages
The top four finishers in each repechage and the fastest fifth-place finisher advanced to the semifinals.

Semifinals
The top four finishers in each semifinal and the fastest fifth-place finisher advanced to the final.

Final
The final was held on August 4.

Andersson's Olympic medal total was brought to seven with three gold, two silver, and two bronze. Fischer's silver matched the total of Sweden's Gert Fredriksson with eight. Australia's bronze medal crew was foreign-born with Wood (formerly Annemarie Cox) from the Netherlands and Borchert from Germany.

References
1996 Summer Olympics official report Volume 3. p. 168. 
Sports-reference.com 1996 women's K-2 500 m results.
Wallechinsky, David and Jaime Loucky (2008). "Canoeing: Women's Kayak Pairs 500 Meters". In The Complete Book of the Olympics: 2008 Edition. London: Aurum Press Limited. p. 493.

Women's K-2 500
Olympic
Women's events at the 1996 Summer Olympics